Holman Dome is a dome-shaped nunatak  southwest of Watson Bluff, on the east side of David Island, Antarctica. It was discovered by the Australasian Antarctic Expedition, 1911–14, under Mawson, who named it for William A. Holman, Premier of New South Wales in 1911.

References

Nunataks of Queen Mary Land